also produced hydraulic presses with the brand name "speed-hy-matic" a high speed hydraulic press, 

Dominion Engineering Works was a company with headquarters in Montreal, Quebec, Canada.

References

External links 

Annual Report from 1939

Manufacturing companies based in Montreal
Defunct manufacturing companies of Canada
Industrial machine manufacturers